Rama Medical College or Rama Medical College, Hospital and Research Centre is a Government and private. medical college established in 2011 and located in Hapur, Uttar Pradesh, India.

Courses offered

External Links 

 Official website

See also 

 Rama Medical College, Hospital and Research Centre (Kanpur)
 Rama University

References

Private medical colleges in India
Medical colleges in Uttar Pradesh
Education in Ghaziabad, Uttar Pradesh
Educational institutions established in 2011
2011 establishments in Uttar Pradesh